James Donald Skinner (January 12, 1917 – July 11, 2007) was the head coach, chief scout and farm director, director of player personnel, director of hockey operations, assistant general manager, and general manager for the Detroit Red Wings of the National Hockey League.

Playing career
Skinner played for the Selkirk Fishermen, Winnipeg Rangers and the Winnipeg Falcons in his teens. He was offered a contract with New York Rangers but declined the offer and played for the Flin Flon Bombers instead. Skinner was a member of the Bombers team, which won the Sask. Senior Hockey League Championship in 1938. 

Skinner would later move on to serve as a player/coach for the Omaha Knights, followed by a stint with the Indianapolis Capitals playing alongside his brother, Morden Huron Lake "Ducky" Skinner in 1943. Skinner's playing career ended prematurely as a result of injuries. It was at that time, Skinner opted to enter the coaching ranks.

Coaching career
Skinner was hired to coach the Windsor Spitfires by Jack Adams in 1947, staying in the position until 1953, when he became the head coach of the Hamilton Red Wings, where he guided the team to a Memorial Cup victory in 1962.

At the end of 1953-54 season, Skinner was hired by Adams to serve as the head coach for the Detroit Red Wings. As a rookie head coach, Skinner guided the Red Wings to a victory over the Montreal Canadiens in the 1955 Stanley Cup Finals, which wound up being the last time the Red Wings won the trophy until 1997. Skinner is credited with starting the tradition of kissing the Stanley Cup upon victory.

In the 1956-57 season, Skinner guided the Red Wings to a first place finish in the standings, before being defeated by the Boston Bruins in the 1957 Stanley Cup playoffs. 

Skinner resigned as the Red Wings head coach in 1958, due to illness. Skinner finished his coaching career with a record of 123–78–46, coaching in three National Hockey League All-Star Games from 1954 to 1958. Skinner continued to work for the team in different managerial duties, before his retirement in 1983.

Skinner was credited with the implementation of the NHL Entry Draft, which was meant to give teams a chance to select players outside their territorial region.

Skinner was inducted into numerous sports hall of fames for his contributions. He was first inducted into the Detroit Red Wings Hall of Fame in 1977 and the Windsor Essex County Sports Hall of Fame as a founder in 2006.

Skinner was inducted as a builder into both the Manitoba Hockey Hall of Fame in 1986 and the Manitoba Sports Hall of Fame as May 24, 2014.

Personal life
Skinner had two brothers, Gordon and Morden (Ducky). After their father James Skinner Sr. died, the three of them inherited "Skinner's" restaurant (established in 1929) located in Lockport, Manitoba, Canada.

Skinner married Vivian Anna Reynolds in 1943. The couple had four children, Holly, Karen, Tess, and James (Jr). Skinner died in Windsor, Ontario on July 11, 2007, six months after his wife's death.

Both of Skinner's nicknames, "Jimmy" and "Jimmie", were used in his professional playing and coaching careers.

Coaching record

References

1917 births
2007 deaths
Detroit Red Wings coaches
Detroit Red Wings executives
Detroit Red Wings general managers
Detroit Red Wings scouts
Ice hockey people from Manitoba
Sportspeople from Selkirk, Manitoba
Stanley Cup champions
Stanley Cup championship-winning head coaches